Qudus Fakoya Oluwadamilare, popularly known as Qdot, is a Nigerian musician and a songwriter. He is known for his songs "Gbese", "Alomo meta" and "Emilokan". He is the CEO of Yoruba Boi Music record label and the winner of the 2019 Best Indigenous Artiste Award.

Early life and education 

Qdot was the first born of his father. He obtained his SSCE certificate from United Secondary School and obtained his post secondary school certificate from Yaba College of Technology where he studied General Arts.

Career 
Qdot began his musical career when he was in elementary school. He broke into limelight in 2013 with his songs "Alomo meta" and "Ibadan" where he featured another popular musician Olamide. Qdot majorly sings in Yoruba language.

Discography 
Qdot has released different songs including:

 "Turn Up"
 "Ijo Gelede"
 "Gbese"
 "La La Lu"
 "Orin Emi"
 "Afarawe"
 "Fuel Subsidy"
 "The Story"
 "Ole Aare"
 "Orijin"
 "Alhaji"
 "Apala New School"
 "Emilokan"
 "Jaiye"
 "German"

Crew 
Qdot's crew is made up of twenty seven members including a vocalist, backup singers, stage dancers, percussionists, and instrumentalists.

Awards 
2019 OYA Best Indigenous Artiste.

References 

Nigerian musicians
Year of birth missing (living people)
Living people
Place of birth missing (living people)
Nigerian songwriters
Nigerian chief executives